Kobar Prison, formerly known as Cooper prison, is one of the oldest prisons in Sudan, dating back to 1903. It was built by the administration of the former Anglo-Egyptian Sudan (1899-1956) and was named 'Kobar' in Arabic after the British official Cooper, who was in charge of the prison’s early administration.

Since its establishment, it has been Sudan's most notorious prison. It consists of six sections, and it was infamous for being the detention center for thousands of prisoners of conscience and politicians. In 2019, former President Omar al-Bashir was taken to this prison after having been overthrown in a coup d'etat.

Description
The prison was built with bricks and is guarded by high concrete walls and can hold hundreds of prisoners in its small and overcrowded cells. Its surface area is about five thousand square meters and was designed like prisons in the United Kingdom of the early 19th century. There is a special wing for political prisoners that has been used for the imprisonment or execution of former politicians or other well-known Sudanese personalities. During the government of Omar al-Bashir, the National Intelligence and Security Service (NISS) was in charge of the prison's administration.

It is located in the city of Khartoum North in the Kobar neighborhood, near the Blue Nile and next to the Signal Corps.

Notable inmates
 Omar al-Bashir (2019–present), deposed President of Sudan
Amin Mekki Medani, politician and human rights activist (2014–2015)
Farouk Abu Issa, former chairman of the National Consensus Forces (2014)
Usamah Mohamad, blogger, and citizen journalist (2012)
 Hassan Al-Turabi, former religious and political leader (2009)
Ibrahim el-Salahi, painter and former government official (1976)
 Abdel Khaliq Mahjub, former Secretary General of the Sudanese Communist Party (1971)
 Sadiq al-Mahdi, former prime minister and politician (1970)

References

Khartoum North
Prisons in Sudan
Architecture in Sudan
1903 establishments in Sudan